Canoe Run is a stream in the U.S. state of West Virginia. It is a tributary of West Fork River.

Canoe Run received its name from an incident when pioneers found a canoe there left by Indians.

See also
List of rivers of West Virginia

References

Rivers of Lewis County, West Virginia
Rivers of West Virginia